Eurata elegans is a moth of the subfamily Arctiinae. It was described by Herbert Druce in 1906. It is found in Paraguay.

References

Arctiinae
Moths described in 1906